Duilio César Jean Pierre Davino Rodríguez (born 21 March 1976) is a Mexican former professional footballer and executive who last served as Sporting Chairman of Liga MX club Monterrey.

Playing career
Davino was called up to play in the 1995 Pan American games and played for Mexico in the 1996 Olympic Games in Atlanta. He made his professional debut for the Tecos UAG in 1994. Two years later, he played for the national team's senior side in the CONCACAF Gold Cup. In 1997, he moved to Club America. Davino's success at the club level helped him reach the 1998 World Cup in France, where he played under Manuel Lapuente, who later became his coach at América. He earned a total of 84 caps, scoring 2 goals.

On 9 January 2008, Davino joined FC Dallas in Major League Soccer. Davino chose not to continue at FC Dallas and left at the end of the 2008 season terminating his 2-year contract. He played as a defensive player for CF Monterrey until May 2011 when he announced his departure from the club to Estudiantes Tecos.

Personal life
He is the son of the former Argentine footballer Jorge Davino, and the brother of Flavio Davino, a fellow defenseman who played for Tecos UAG and retired from soccer in 2006. Dulio also had another brother Jorge Davino, who died in a car accident and it is said that Jorge had more potential than his two brothers. Davino is also of Italian descent which would have allowed him to play for the Italy national team.

Honours
UAG
Mexican Primera División: 1993–94
CONCACAF Cup Winners Cup: 1995

América
Mexican Primera División: Verano 2002, Clausura 2005
Campeón de Campeones: 2005
CONCACAF Champions' Cup: 2006
CONCACAF Giants Cup: 2001

Monterrey
Mexican Primera División: Apertura 2009, Apertura 2010
CONCACAF Champions League: 2010–11

Mexico
CONCACAF Gold Cup: 1996, 1998

Individual
Mexican Primera División Rookie of the Tournament: 1995–96
Mexican Primera División Center Back of the Tournament: Apertura 2009

Career statistics

References

External links

 

1976 births
Living people
Mexican people of Argentine descent
Sportspeople of Argentine descent
Sportspeople from León, Guanajuato
Footballers from Guanajuato
Association football defenders
Mexican footballers
Mexico under-20 international footballers
Mexico international footballers
Olympic footballers of Mexico
Footballers at the 1996 Summer Olympics
1997 FIFA Confederations Cup players
1998 FIFA World Cup players
1997 Copa América players
2004 Copa América players
CONCACAF Gold Cup-winning players
Tecos F.C. footballers
Club América footballers
FC Dallas players
Club Puebla players
C.F. Monterrey players
Mexican expatriate footballers
Expatriate soccer players in the United States
Mexican expatriate sportspeople in the United States
Liga MX players
Major League Soccer players
1996 CONCACAF Gold Cup players
1998 CONCACAF Gold Cup players
Mexican people of Italian descent